TSC22 domain family protein 1 is a protein that in humans is encoded by the TSC22D1 gene.

TSC22 encodes a transcription factor and belongs to the large family of early response genes.

TSC22D1 forms homodimers via its conserved leucine zipper domain and heterodimerizes with TSC22D4. TSC22D1 has transcriptional repressor activity.

References

Further reading

External links
 

Transcription factors